This is a list of cities in Xinjiang Uyghur Autonomous Region in the People's Republic of China. A settlement with a population over 100,000 is usually counted as a city in China. The capital and largest city is Ürümqi. The list is in alphabetical order.

Prefectural-level

County-level

See also
 List of cities in China
 Lists of cities by country